Jessie Chung is a Malaysian musician, singer, songwriter, actress, author, naturopath, and nutritional consultant.

She released her album Home in 1998 and There is a Decision in 2000. After a 5-year hiatus, she released Loving You in 2006. She is currently active in China, Southeast Asia, and Australia, and has released nine albums since the beginning of her career, most notably Love in You, Tearless Sky, There You Are and Be Strong. She currently serves as president of the Malaysia Naturopathic Association (MNA) and vice-president of the Malaysian Anti-Cancer Association (MACA). She has written several medical publications, including, Stay Away from Cancer and Stay Away from Diseases, and is the author of the Jessie Diary series.

Career

Early Years
Jessie Chung, a descendant of the Hakka lineage from Dapu, Guangzhou, was born in Kuching, Malaysia. She is the second child in her family, with one elder sister, three younger sisters, and one younger brother. Chung grew up with a musical background and passed grade 8 organ at a young age. As a child and teenager, she participated extensively in singing competitions. She wanted to pursue a full-time musical career after graduating from high school, but in the end, she chose to focus on her studies. After graduating from university, Chung joined the medical and healthcare industry and founded Natural Health Farm.

2006–2011: Career Beginnings 
In 2006, Chung released Loving You with Symphony Musical House. The album was produced by Deng Zhi Zhang and contains 10 original tracks.

In 2007, Jessie Chung began authoring and published her first book, Jessie Diary. The latest book in the series is Jessie Diary 7: A Starry Sky.

In 2009, Chung released Message of Love from the Moon through Symphony Musical House.

In 2011, Chung released I Just Fall in Love Again through Symphony Musical House.

2012–2014: Love in You and acting 
In 2012, Chung invited Jet Yi and Wu Guan Yan to produce her album. They wrote ten songs and five song lyrics, while Chung herself wrote the lyrics for the other five.
On 30 November 2012, Chung abandoned US$33 million of inheritance and released Love in You in Taiwan. Her husband appeared to show his support. The album topped Ai FM's Chart in Malaysia, occupying the number one spot for two consecutive weeks. The eponymous single “Love in You” was chosen as the theme song and ending theme for Fox Networks Group's Korean drama Secret Garden.

Chung held her first concert in Taipei, the Love in You Concert on 21 December 2012. Her ex-fiancée flew from the US while her mother-in-law flew from Malaysia to attend the concert.

In 2013, Chung starred as lead actress in the Griffin Group production Faces, playing Li Yu and Yuan Yuan, the main character. Jackie Lui starred as the lead actor while supporting actors include Liu Hua, Law Kar-ying, and Cheng Pei-pei.

Chung was inducted into the Chinese Who's Who Society in 2013.

Near the end of 2013, Chung starred in Unchanging Love, a film production organized by the students of One World Hanxing College of Journalism and Communication. Proceeds of the film went to fund treatments of underprivileged cancer patients.

In 2014, Chung cameoed in the movie Kungfu Taboo, sharing the screen with Kara Wai, Frederick Lee, and Henry Thia.

2015–2016: Tearless Sky 
On 21 May 2015, Chung released Tearless Sky, an album that also presents itself as a self-narrative. Renowned variety show host Hsu Nai-lin came to her album release party to show his support. The album rose to 6th place on the Pop Radio Top Ten Music Chart, 20th place on Five Music's Mandarin Chart and 4th place on the i Radio Top Hits Chart.

On 4 June 2015, Jessie Chung was invited to appear on the Taiwanese variety show Kangsi Coming. She was also invited to many other TV shows including Genius Go Go Go, GTO Reunion, Hot Door Night, 100% Entertainment, etc.

On 30 June 2015, Chung performed the Tearless Sky Concert in Taipei.

On 21 September 2015, Faces, starring Chung and Jackie Lui, premiered in Malaysia.

On 17 October 2015, Chung held her solo concert, the Love Unity Concert, to fund treatments of underprivileged cancer patients. Guest artists included Malaysian singers Fauziah Latiff and Ziana Zain, and the concert raised RM170,000.

On 12 November 2015, Chung signed with Beijing CTV Star Culture Development Co., the same label that Eric Moo is signed to.

On 6 May 2016, Chung opened the avant-garde Exquisite Chinese Orchestra Concert. She was accompanied by a 22-piece Chinese orchestra while she performed many classic songs, making her the first Malaysian act to completely replace a modern band with a traditional Chinese orchestra in concert. Ten shows in total were played in both West and East Malaysia.

On 28 May 2016, Chung was cast as the main character Yang Xiao Fan in Moonlight, a large-scale stage production based on a true story. The stage play was shown all across Malaysia, and all proceeds went to fund treatments of underprivileged cancer patients. During the third performance, Chung accidentally sprained her ankle but continued to perform until the curtain call, despite the pain.

2016–2017: Australian record deal and Be Strong 
In 2016, Jessie Chung signed to Future Entertainment & Music Group Australia to prepare for her debut in the international music scene and began to record the album There You Are.

On 23 August 2016, Jessie Chung released her debut English album There You Are. Ditching her usual softer personality, Jessie chose to rock a blonde hairstyle and rebellious obsidian dress to fit in with the new genre of her album. Future Entertainment & Music Group Australia's CEO appeared at the release party to congratulate her.

On 23 August 2016, Chung released her debut English album There You Are. Future Entertainment & Music Group Australia's CEO appeared at the release party to congratulate her.

On 24 August 2016, Chung started her There You Are Concert Tour, completing five shows in Kuala Lumpur, Penang, and Kuching.

On 30 October 2016, Chung brought her There You Are Tour to Taipei Ximending.

On 13 November 2016, Chung's album There You Are peaked at No.2 on Five Music's International Chart and No.2 on i Radio's International Chart, becoming the first Malaysian singer to enter into Five Music's International Chart. Her record label presented her with the Outstanding Achievement Award.

On 16 December 2016, Chung released her second Australian-produced English rock album, Be Strong. At the press conference, Chung received the title “Princess of Rock” and a diamond-studded guitar as a gift from her record label.

From 18 December 2016 to May 2017, Jessie Chung toured across Malaysia with the Be Strong Concert Tour. She also performed in China and Taiwan, bringing her shows to a total of 16 different cities.

On 30 December 2016, Chung's album There You Are achieved platinum status.

On 3 February 2017, during Chinese New Year, Chung was struck on the nose by her partner in a badminton match and was sent to the emergency room.

On 7 May 2017, a press conference for the release of Be Strong was held in Taipei, Taiwan.

On 19 May 2017, Chung's album Be Strong sold over 15,000 physical copies and achieved platinum status. In addition, the album topped both Five Music's International Chart and i Radio's International Chart with two No.1 positions, and the eponymous single shot to No.3 on UFO Radio's International Top Singles Chart. The music videos of Be Strong also exceeded 5 million views on YouTube.

2018 - present: Stage Play 
In December 2017, Chung was cast as the lead female role Sandy in Music Box, a large-scale stage production adapted from a true story and produced by Australian producer Neil McLean. The stage play was performed in Taiwan, Indonesia and all across Malaysia. All proceeds went to fund treatments of underprivileged cancer patients.

On 3 July 2020 to 18 July 2020, Chung was cast as the lead female role Yinglan Shia in the stage play Meant to Be, together with American actor Paul Lee.

On 24 July 2020 to 23 August 2020, Chung was cast as the lead female role Lin Daiyu in the stage play adaptation of the renowned Chinese novel The Dream of Red Mansions (Chinese: 紅樓夢), with a total of 13 shows.

On 28 August 2020 to 13 September 2020, Chung was cast as the lead female role Du Xiaomeng in the stage play Tearless Sky, with a total of 8 shows.

On 26 September 2020 to 4 October 2020, Chung was cast as the lead female role He Peirou in the stage play Afterglow, with a total of 4 shows, which was interrupted due to the lockdown during the pandemic.

On 25 February 2023, Chung was cast as the lead female role of Zhu Yingtai in the stage play adaptation of the Chinese legend Butterfly Lovers, together with 35 casts from Taiwan, US, Australia, and Malaysia.

Marriage 
On 12 November 2005, Chung was married to Joshua Beh at the Riverside Majestic Hotel in Kuching. Their marriage is not supported or recognized under Malaysia's law and they never received their marriage certificates from the government due to the fact that she was a male(transgender) and married to a male. They have stated that the situation is understandable under the Malaysian constitution that forbids same sex marriage.</ref> On 7 May 2017, at the press conference for the release of Be Strong, Chung's artist manager brought her and Joshua their Australian permanent residence certificate and stated that Chung and her husband will soon legally register their marriage in Australia and hold a wedding once again at Gold Coast.

Discography

Concert tours

Acting career

Theatre

Film

References

External links 
 Official Webpage

Year of birth missing (living people)
Living people
Transgender women
Transgender singers
Malaysian LGBT people
21st-century Malaysian women singers
Mandopop singers
Malaysian people of Hakka descent
Malaysian Mandopop singers
Malaysian actresses
People from Sarawak
People from Kuching
Hakka musicians
Transgender women musicians